Safety Worst is a 1915 silent comedy film featuring Oliver Hardy.

Plot

Cast
 Raymond McKee - Billington Biggs
 Oliver Hardy - Bill Jones (as Babe Hardy)
 Frances Ne Moyer - Jane Hudson

See also
 List of American films of 1915
 Oliver Hardy filmography

External links

1915 films
American silent short films
American black-and-white films
1915 comedy films
1915 short films
Silent American comedy films
American comedy short films
1910s American films